ZMap may refer to:

ZMap (software), a free and open-source network scanner
ZMap, an algorithm for storing cutter location values
ZMapp, an experimental treatment for Ebola virus disease